The Rio Cobre Dam is a diversion dam on the Rio Cobre near Spanish Town in Saint Catherine Parish, Jamaica. It is owned by the National Irrigation Commission. It also provides municipal water to Spanish Town.

Plans for the scheme began with then Governor of Jamaica John Peter Grant in 1870. Construction began at the end of 1872 and by June 1876 the dam and canals were complete.

In the late 1800s the West India Electric Company constructed a 900 kW hydroelectric power station upstream at Bog Walk to power a tram system in Kingston. On 24 June 1904, while workers were cleaning the station's penstock, water was accidentally released down it killing 33 of them. The power station was closed in 1966, 62 years after the accident but, the dam, the ruins of the turbine house and some of the concrete supports of the penstock still exist today.

See also
Hermitage Dam

References

Dams in Jamaica
Dams completed in 1876
Buildings and structures in Saint Catherine Parish
Spanish Town